"Southbound Pachyderm" is a song by the American rock band Primus. It was released on their 1995 album Tales from the Punchbowl. The song was also released as a single, and a stop-motion animated video was made for it. The song is about the extinction threat faced by elephants, rhinos and hippos.

Les Claypool said in 2015 that Southbound Pachyderm is one of his favorites songs to play live. It has been played 457 times since its live debut, making it the 7th most played song by Primus.

Track listing

 "Southbound Pachyderm (Radio Edit)" - 4:00
 "Wynona's Big Brown Beaver" - 4:24
 "Jerry Was A Race Car Driver" - 3:11
 "Those Damned Blue Collar Tweekers" - 5:18
 "My Name Is Mud" - 4:40

Background
The inspiration for the song came from an image that CMJ New Music Monthly said Claypool "couldn't shake ... 'an elephant's ass heading away from you'".

Music videos

Two music videos exist for the song "Southbound Pachyderm".

The first version was included in the CD+ Enhanced CD version of the album, which allowed a computer's CD-ROM to access enhanced aspects of the album, namely becoming a tug boat captain that allowed one to explore different parts of the punchbowl world.  It was a pastiche of San Francisco, elephants with propellers and wings, and psychedelic imagery. It is currently not published, although such version can be viewed online.

The official music video for the song is in entirely stop-motion with the band (in live action) appearing on TV screens. For the stop motion story, it features elephants being stalked by poachers but are saved at the last moment by several scientists. At the climax of the video, the scientists and the elephants (along with some hippos and rhinos) then escape from their laboratory when the poachers begin to attack via orders from their leader.

Claypool came up with the idea for the video and included regular character Flouncin' Fred.  The video reflects Claypool's concern over the conservation status of pachyderms.  He and Raub Shapiro co-directed the video.  Shapiro had previously produced the video for "Wynona's Big Brown Beaver".  Claypool initially worked on storyboards for the video but moved on to  foam sculptures when he found that medium easier to express his ideas.  Raub then did storyboards, and they handed the work to animators, who used stop motion photography.  Animation was slow work; Claypool said that the studio was only able to produce six to ten seconds of footage per day, and the video took six weeks to complete.

Legacy
Claypool later referenced the song in a pinot noir wine called Purple Pachyderm.

References

Primus (band) songs
1995 singles
Experimental rock songs
1995 songs
Songs about mammals
Songs written by Les Claypool
Songs written by Larry LaLonde
Songs written by Tim Alexander
Interscope Records singles